The 2011 Missouri Valley Conference men's soccer season was the 21st season of men's varsity soccer in the conference.

The 2011 Missouri Valley Conference Men's Soccer Tournament was hosted and won by Creighton.

Teams

MVC Tournament

See also 

 Missouri Valley Conference
 Missouri Valley Conference men's soccer tournament
 2011 NCAA Division I men's soccer season
 2011 in American soccer

References 

Missouri Valley Conference
2011 NCAA Division I men's soccer season